WCKN (92.5 FM) is a radio station broadcasting a country music format. Licensed to Moncks Corner, South Carolina, United States, the station serves the Charleston, South Carolina area. The station is currently owned by the Charleston Radio Group subsidiary of Saga Communications. The station's studios are located in Charleston (east of the Cooper River) and the transmitter tower is in Mount Pleasant.

History
This station started out at 92.1 with 3,000 watts and the letters WTWE and was licensed to Manning, South Carolina.

In 1986, WTWE moved to 92.5 and became WHLZ "Wheels 92.5", a country radio station, broadcasting at 100,000 watts while remaining licensed to Manning. It was one of the biggest country stations in the Carolinas, with a signal from Lumberton, NC to Charleston, SC.

92.5 moved closer to Charleston in 2003 and became hot adult contemporary WCSQ "Coast 92.5," while the country format and WHLZ call letters moved to a smaller station licensed to Marion, South Carolina, near Florence.  WCSQ changed its format to top 40 with the call letters WIHB in 2005 with the moniker B92. It mainly competed with the more established top 40 in the market, WSSX, although B92 had more of a rhythmic lean.

In 2009, WIHB applied for a taller tower with power reduced to 77,000 watts.

On Friday, March 19, 2010, "B-92" flipped formats from top 40 to Mainstream Urban as "92-5 The Box." The station called itself "Charleston's New #1 for Hip-Hop" and  featured the Rickey Smiley Morning Show from 6:00am to 10:00am.

On May 31, 2011, WIHB changed their format to country, simulcasting WIOP 95.9 FM, which began its own format two weeks later. WIHB became WCKN "Kickin' 92.5", with Charlie James of WWNU as the morning host.

In August 2013, WCKN began calling itself "New Country, Kickin’ 92.5." In June 2017, WCKN rebranded as "92.5 Kickin' Country" with the slogan "Real Country Variety from the 1990s to Now."

On September 6, 2017, the sale of the station to Saga Communications was complete.

Call sign history
The station was assigned call sign WHLZ on 1986-03-01. On 2003-01-01, the station changed its call sign to WCSQ and again on 2005-09-21 to WIHB and on 2011-06-03 to the current WCKN.

Previous logos

References

External links
Station website

CKN
Country radio stations in the United States
Radio stations established in 1986
1986 establishments in South Carolina